Visual Studies Workshop (VSW) is a non-profit organization dedicated to art education based in Rochester, New York, in the Neighborhood of the Arts. VSW supports makers and interpreters of images through education, publications, exhibitions, and collections. VSW houses a bookstore, microcinema, exhibition gallery, and research center, and hosts artists-in-residence.

VSW was founded in 1969 by photographer, writer, curator and educator, Nathan Lyons. VSW is artist-run and an educational and support center for photography, artist books, and other media art. VSW ran a Master of Fine Arts (MFA) program through SUNY Buffalo until 1981, and then through State University of New York at Brockport until 2022. Since its inception, VSW has had connections with regional artists and communities involved with early experimental video and media access, including Experimental Television Center, Steina and Woody Vasulka, the Videofreex, and in particular, Rochester's grassroots media access organization, Portable Channel.

Education 
In the Winter 1961 issue of Aperture, Nathan Lyons described the very first photography workshops he led that would eventually lead to the formation of Visual Studies Workshop. These workshops began in 1959 and centered around "discussion concerning 'creative photography'" and the texts of György Kepes and László Moholy-Nagy. In 1968, Lyons proposed a program in Photographic Studies to Eric Larrabee, the provost of SUNY Buffalo. The proposal included Lyons, Beaumont Newhall, and John Wood as instructors. This led to a pilot program at the  George Eastman Museum, where Lyons was curator, and following Lyons' resignation from the museum, the founding of VSW in 1969.

Starting in 1969, Visual Studies Workshop offered a Master of Fine Arts (MFA) degree through SUNY Buffalo, a program with a focus on expanding the potential for photography, books, and media arts. American photographer Charles H. Traub described VSW as the "first school to stimulate curatorial interest in photography." This environment differed from a traditional arts-academic setting, with students from a range of backgrounds that were not exclusive to visual arts. The MFA program was interdisciplinary, with Lyons describing it as "a more collective activity." Later, the MFA program was transferred to SUNY Brockport, where it accepted new students until 2022.

A diverse range of artists have taught at, published through, and stayed in-residence at VSW, including Jacki Apple, Ulises Carrión, Robert Frank, Nam June Paik, Keith A. Smith, Buzz Spector, and many others.

Collections 
VSW maintains both archival and research collections of photography, independent film and video, electronic imaging, visual books and the publication arts. The Research Center hosts the Independent Press Archive which is one of the largest collections of artists’ books in the northeast with around 27,000 prints from 19th century vernacular images to contemporary experimental works. The Soibelman Picture Agency Archives is also present with around 40,000 international press images from the 1920s and 30s. The collection also contains Joseph Selle’s Fox Movie Flash Archive with an estimated 800,000 images of people on the streets of San Francisco in the 1940s to the 1960s. VSW also holds the archives of Lejaren à Hiller who was an American illustrator and photographer and who is widely known for American photographic illustration.

VSW holds the Portable Channel tape archive, over 900 magnetic tapes chronicling Rochester's history of grassroots activism and protest in the 1970s.

Afterimage 
Afterimage: The Journal of Media Arts and Cultural Criticism was founded in 1972 by Nathan Lyons. From its inaugural issue, the magazine aimed to pose "a challenge to existing centres of practice and education" as well as "to institutional hierarchies, widening the remit of art criticism and theoretical debate and engaging directly with context, community and issues of accountability."

Afterimage is a bi-monthly publication that was produced by Visual Studies Workshop from 1972 through 2018 and is currently published by the University of California Press. The publication includes visual arts, photography, independent film, and video, new media and alternative publishing. It covers topics of issues and debates within art history, visual and cultural studies, and related fields. Afterimage also includes articles, conference and festival reports, book and exhibition reviews, artist’s books, and exhibition catalogs.

VSW Press 
VSW Press was founded by Joan Lyons in 1971. In 1984, Lyons edited the first anthology of critical essays and sources for the field of artists' books, Artists' books : a critical anthology and sourcebook. In the beginning, VSW first provided printing presses for artists to experiment with. VSW then began employing professionals to run a Heidelberg offset press to produce publications that artists, staff, and students had constructed. The process of publication was then switched to digital means with the addition of a computer lab. Many artists-in-residence that have come through VSW have published through VSW Press.

Notable alumni

See also 
Rochester's Culture and Recreation

References

External links 

Art schools in New York (state)
Arts centers in New York (state)
Educational institutions established in 1969
Education in Rochester, New York
Culture of Rochester, New York
Photo archives in the United States